Sukasada is a district (kecamatan) in the regency of Buleleng in northern Bali, Indonesia.

Districts of Bali